The Geely Borui is a large family car/mid-size car (D-segment in Europe) produced by the Chinese automaker Geely since April 2015.

History

At the 2011 Shanghai Motor Show, Volvo unveiled the Concept Universe. However, that concept was cancelled after Peter Horbury left Volvo as he joined Geely as vice president of design in 2012. The Geely KC concept was unveiled in April 2013 at the Shanghai Auto Show; the designers already started off the project 2 years ago in 2011. The design of the Borui is based on the KC Concept unveiled at the 2013 Shanghai Auto Show; Peter took the idea of the ripple intake grille and the fastback style from the Concept Universe for the KC Concept. During the 2018 Beijing Auto Show, the facelifted Geely Borui was revealed with the sportier Geely Borui GE model.

Development
In mid-2014, the KC concept was confirmed for production as the GC9; the model was later renamed Borui. The car was developed from a new platform jointly developed with Volvo. The Borui is a fastback, which is an uncommon design in the Chinese automobile market. The Borui was the first car model showing what Peter Horbury, the vice president of design for Geely's idea of "Future Geely": Uncommon ripple intake grille, sportive and retro. Peter thinks that a car should look active, since it's not something like a furniture.

Technology
The interior is mostly chrome plated. Orange decorating LED light strip and ACC (Autonomous cruise control system) were available.
It is equipped with double wishbone suspension tuned by automotive technology company Prodrive. The Borui engine options include a 1.8T GDI engine and 3.5L V6 aluminum engine, as well as a six-speed direct shift gearbox provided by Australian transmission producer DSI, which was acquired by Geely in 2009.

Engines
2015: 1.8T 163hp L4 petrol, 2.4L 162hp L4 petrol, 3.5L 275hp V6 petrol
2016: 1.8T 163hp L4 petrol, 2.4L 162hp L4 petrol
2017: 1.8T 184hp L4 petrol, 2.4L 162hp L4 Petrol
2018: 1.8T 184hp L4 petrol

Facelift
The Borui facelifted model had minor changes to the exterior. The only thing had changed outward is the intake grille. The facelifted Borui carries a Geely G-Power 1.8 Turbo Engine (petrol) which increased the power. The maximum power output reached  and the peak torque reaches . Geely official said the 0-100 km/h (0-62 mph) acceleration of New Borui takes 9.5 seconds. Additionally, the facelifted Geely improved the energy output but had reduced fuel consumption by 4.8 percent. The chassis adjustment had access to resources from Volvo and Lean Nova and switched 46 of the bushings, together with 8 of the pads. The braking system was also switched which shortened the braking distance. The official 100-0 km/h (62-0 mph) braking distance was cut down to 37.14 metres.

Variants

The Geely Borui GE is Geely's flagship hybrid large family car based on Geely CMA platform and made its first appearance in March 2018 and went on sale in May 2018. It carries a 1.5T 180hp L3 petrol engine and a 7-speed DCT gearbox for both mild hybrid version and plug in hybrid version.

Awards
The Borui received 5 stars in C-NCAP crash testing.

References

External links

Carscoops.com
 Geely.hihcar.com

Borui
Mid-size cars
Front-wheel-drive vehicles
Sedans
Cars introduced in 2015
Cars of China